The Building at 1929–1931 Sherman Avenue is a historic apartment building in Evanston, Illinois. The three-story brick building was built in 1928. The building has an L-shaped layout with a half courtyard, a relatively common layout for Evanston's apartments. Architects Maher and McGrew, who designed several other buildings in Evanston, designed the building in the Tudor Revival style. The building's design features large sections of rough limestone on the basement level, limestone quoins, segmental arched windows, half-timbering, and a series of gables and dormers at the roof line.

The building was added to the National Register of Historic Places on March 15, 1984.

References

Buildings and structures on the National Register of Historic Places in Cook County, Illinois
Residential buildings on the National Register of Historic Places in Illinois
Buildings and structures in Evanston, Illinois
Apartment buildings in Illinois
Tudor Revival architecture in Illinois
Residential buildings completed in 1928